Podvis Col (‘Sedlovina Podvis’ \se-dlo-vi-'na 'pod-vis\) is the ice-covered col of elevation 1494 m on Davis Coast in Graham Land, Antarctica, extending 1.6 km between Korten Ridge to the northwest, and Tsarevets Buttress and Detroit Plateau to the southeast.  It is overlooking Sabine Glacier to the north and Temple Glacier to the southwest.

The col is named after the settlement of Podvis in Southeastern Bulgaria.

Location
German-British mapping in 1996.

Map
 Trinity Peninsula. Scale 1:250000 topographic map No. 5697. Institut für Angewandte Geodäsie and British Antarctic Survey, 1996.

Notes

References
 SCAR Composite Antarctic Gazetteer.
 Bulgarian Antarctic Gazetteer. Antarctic Place-names Commission. (details in Bulgarian, basic data in English)

External links
 Podvis Col. Copernix satellite image

Mountain passes of Graham Land
Bulgaria and the Antarctic
Davis Coast